You're the Doctor is a 1938 British comedy film directed by Roy Lockwood and starring Barry K. Barnes, Googie Withers and Norma Varden. The screenplay concerns a young woman who pretends to be ill to avoid going on a cruise with her parents, which leads to a series of confusions.

It was made at Isleworth Studios.

Cast
 Barry K. Barnes as John Meriden
 Googie Withers as Helen Firmstone
 Norma Varden as Lady Beatrice
 Joan White as Jane
 Gus McNaughton as Kemp
 Paul Blake as Reggie Bissett
 James Harcourt as William Firmstone
 Margaret Yarde as Mrs Taggart
 Aubrey Mallalieu as Vicar
 Bruce Seton as Appleby
 Eliot Makeham as Prout

Critical reception
TV Guide called the film a "Strained idea cleverly carried off."

References

Bibliography
 Low, Rachael. Filmmaking in 1930s Britain. George Allen & Unwin, 1985.
 Wood, Linda. British Films, 1927-1939. British Film Institute, 1986.

External links

1938 films
1938 comedy films
1930s English-language films
Films directed by Roy Lockwood
British comedy films
Films shot at Isleworth Studios
British black-and-white films
1930s British films